This is a growing List of Islamic muftis and territorial muftiates.   The mufti is the official head of the muftiate.  The Grand Mufti is the official head of a board of regional muftis.

Countries

Albanian muftiates

Algerian muftiates

Belarusian muftiates

Bosnian muftiates 
The muftiates of Croatia, Sandžak, and Slovenia are under authority of the Grand Muftiate of Bosnia and Herzegovina

Mešihat of Croatia
The Mešihat of Croatia is under the authority of the Grand Muftiate of Bosnia and Herzegovina

Mešihat of Sandžak
The Mešihat of Sandžak is under the authority of the Grand Muftiate of Bosnia and Herzegovina

Mešihat of Slovenia
The Mešihat of Slovenia is under the authority of the Grand Muftiate of Bosnia and Herzegovina

Bulgarian muftiates

Muftiates in the Caucasus

Greek muftiates

Office of the Grand Mufti of India

Kazakh muftiates

Kosovar muftiates

Kyrgyz muftiates

Lithuanian muftiates

Macedonian muftiates

Montenegrin muftiates

Polish muftiates

Romanian muftiates

Russian muftiates

Serbian muftiates
Mufti of Belgrade and Serbian military forces
Mustafa Jusufspahic

For the Serbian Mesihat of Sandžak see the Muftiate of Bosnia and Herzegovina

Slovenian muftiates

For the Mesihat of Slovenia see Muftiate of Bosnia and Herzegovina.

Soviet-era muftiates

Ukrainian muftiates

Uzbek muftiates

See also
  Muftiate
  Grand Mufti
  Mufti

References 

Religious leadership roles
Muftiates
Muftiates